Peter Asbeck (born September 7, 1947) is an American engineer, currently the Skyworks Professor in High Performance Communications Devices and Circuits at the University of California, San Diego Jacobs School of Engineering, and a publisher author. He is a member of the National Academy of Engineering. for contributions to heterojunction bipolar transistor and integrated circuit technology. He is a power amplifier expert.

References

21st-century American engineers
University of California, San Diego faculty
American non-fiction writers
Members of the United States National Academy of Engineering
Living people
Engineers from California
1947 births